FKU Corrective Colony No. 2 of the FSIN of Russia for the Republic of Mordovia, or simply IK-2 Yavas, is a women's prison in Russia.

WNBA player Brittney Griner was briefly incarcerated in the facility before being released in a December 2022 prisoner exchange for Viktor Bout.

Conditions 
Prisons in Mordovia are regarded by many as having conditions harsher than most Russian prisons. According to University of Helsinki sociologist Olga Zeveleva, who works with the Gulag Echoes project studying Russian prison conditions, "Prisons in Mordovia are notoriously terrible, even by Russian standards. The prisons there are known for the harsh regimes and human rights violations." According to The Guardian, a popular saying among female prison inmates in Russia is "If you haven’t done time in Mordovia, you haven’t done time at all." The prison was built as a part of a system of similar prisons in the region in the 1930s during the Soviet era. University of Oxford scholar Judith Pallot described the prison as being "stuck in time for 50 years." Violence from other prisoners and prison guards is not as frequent as in men's prisons, but isn't uncommon.

Prisoners at IK-2 Mordovia and human rights organizations have lodged complaints about conditions. Former inmate Olga Shilayeva, who was released in 2017, described frequent beatings by Vyacheslav Kimyaev, then a senior official. Kimyaev was later placed in charge of the facility. He was replaced by Yelena Pozdnyakova after a 2021 investigation by Russian authorities. Because of its remote location, human rights organizations have little access for scrutinizing conditions.

Housing 
Inmates are housed dormitory-style with 100 bunk beds in a large room. Personal belongings are not permitted. There is little supervision at night.

Schedule 
Prisoners wake at 6am with group exercises, then operate sewing machines for 10-12 hours per day producing uniforms for military and prison service members.

Notable inmates 
In November 2022 Brittney Griner was transferred to IK-2 to serve a nine-year sentence for possession of medically prescribed vape cartridges containing less than 1 gram total of hashish oil. The Guardian wrote that according to Pallot and other human rights experts, "it was no coincidence that the authorities had chosen to send Griner to IK-2."
On December 8, 2022 the U.S. swapped Griner for convicted Russian arms dealer Viktor Bout.

See also 

 List of prisons
 Prisons in Russia

Notes

References 

Prisons in Russia
Women's prisons